Barry Hugh Crocker  (born 4 November 1935) is an Australian Gold Logie-award winning character actor, television personality, singer, and variety entertainer with a crooning vocal style

Crocker is known for his iconic Australian films during the 1970s The Adventures of Barry McKenzie (1972) and sequel Barry McKenzie Holds His Own (1974). Crocker was also the presenter and leading performer on the TV series The Sound of Music, taking over from entertainer Bobby Limb.

His singing talents eventually earned him over 30 Gold records. In 1971 Sound of Music was the 11th most popular show in the country. Crocker sang the theme tune to the Australian soap opera Neighbours between 1985 and 1992. Crocker published an autobiography called Bazza – The Adventures of Barry Crocker, in 2003.

Early life
Crocker was born in Geelong, Victoria. After undergoing National Service with the RAAF in 1955, Crocker toured with a theatre group and did the club circuit in Melbourne, followed by a partnership with David Clark (aka Dave Nelson), and performed in the UK and the United States.

Career
In 1966, Crocker returned to Australia to star in a TV musical comedy show called 66 And All That, in 1966 hence the title which became the eponymous The Barry Crocker Show (1966–67) on Channel 10 Sydney (now Network Ten). This was followed by the musical variety show Say It With Music (1967–1969), also broadcast on Ten.

Acting
Crocker made his acting debut on a 1969 episode of Skippy the Bush Kangaroo. He has been in a relationship with English actress Katy Manning since 1990, although she moved back to the UK in 2010 and they maintain a long-distance relationship.

Barry Crocker has also had a successful career as a stage, television and motion picture actor, most notably starring alongside Barry Humphries in the title role of Bruce Beresford's 1972 movie The Adventures of Barry McKenzie and its 1974 sequel, Barry McKenzie Holds His Own. The "bogan" character of Barry McKenzie gave rise to Crocker recording such ribald songs as "My One Eyed Trouser Snake" and other "off-colour" songs.

Barry Crocker was Beresford's first choice as lead actor when it came to the filming of David Williamson's popular play Don's Party, but serious back problems curtailed Crocker's screen career at this point, opening the way for John Hargreaves to achieve film success in the coveted role of Don.

Nevertheless, Barry Crocker was crowned Melbourne's King of Moomba in 1976, at the annual entertainment festival

He had the lead role as Governor Alan Smith in the short-lived prison drama Punishment (1981). He guest starred on two episodes of the Australian satirical black comedy series Review with Myles Barlow.
More recent TV roles have included parts in Pizza, Swift and Shift Couriers, and Housos for SBS and The Strange Calls, an ABC2 comedy series.

In 1994, Crocker appeared as himself in the worldwide record-breaking film Muriel's Wedding. Barry proved his acting/comedy credentials once again as the retro-disco-host Donny Destry in the movie Razzle Dazzle in 2009.

Crocker appeared as Charles "Hoot" Russell, Greg Russell's father in the Hey Dad..! episode "Hoot's Boots". This was the second-to-last episode of the show, which spanned 14 seasons. A DVD box set of Hey Dad has had to be abandoned, following the conviction of the original "Dad" – Robert Hughes – on several sex charges.

In 2005, Crocker was featured on the Nine Network program This Is Your Life. It was a rare accolade, as Crocker had already been the subject of this prestigious TV program thirty years earlier, in 1975, when the show was hosted by Roger Climpson.  Crocker was caught by surprise when host Mike Munro and the TV production team arrived, after a lot of careful planning by his long-term partner, Katy Manning, the popular English actress.

Crocker was chosen by Chaim Topol to co-star as his nemesis Lazer Wolfe in a long-running Australian season of the musical Fiddler on the Roof. He also featured in the role of The Lecturer in the 2008 Australian premiere of the stage musical Reefer Madness.

Crocker presented the Australian version of Behind Mansion Walls on the Crime and Investigation network on Foxtel in Australia.

Music career
In 1959, after successfully touring and a number of television appearances, he convinced Cyril Stevens of Spotlight Records in Thornbury to give him and his musical partner to see him. Cyril, who was a photographer by trade, had set up a recording studio in the early 1950s. He recorded manly Jazz and musical events around Victoria. Barry and Dave Clark were about to leave, Cyril wasn't impressed, when Cyril's son entered the room. He recognised the pair from television and concerts, and convinced his father to record the team. Two EPs were recorded totaling eight tracks. The records were Spotlights' highest sellers.

In May 1973, he released the album Music Makes My Day, featuring an updated version of American rockabilly singer Robin Luke's "Susie Darlin' on the Festival Records label. The recording featured Olivia Newton-John and Pat Carroll on backup vocals and enjoyed chart success, peaking at number 7.

He sang the original recording of the theme song for the 1977 Reg Grundy soap opera, The Restless Years (later a hit for Renee Geyer), and also the original theme to the long-running soap opera, Neighbours, another Reg Grundy production. His version was used from 1985 to 1992, and it was also played during the series final episode, which aired in July 2022.

Crocker wrote and recorded an unofficial theme song for the Australian Rules Geelong Football Club, entitled Come on the Cats.

Discography

Charting albums

Charting singles

Awards

Mo Awards
The Australian Entertainment Mo Awards (commonly known informally as the Mo Awards), were annual Australian entertainment industry awards. They recognise achievements in live entertainment in Australia from 1975 to 2016. Barry Crocker won 2 awards in that time and was inducted into the Hall of Fame in 2013.
 (wins only)
|-
| 1976
| Barry Crocker 
| Entertainer of the Year
| 
|-
| 1981
| Barry Crocker 
| Entertainer of the Year
| 
|-
| 2013
| Barry Crocker 
| Hall of Fame
| 
|-

In popular culture
During the 1980s, the rhyming slang expression "Barry Crocker", or simply "Barry" or "Baz", emerged in Australian English to mean a "shocker", as in "very poor".

The most recent notable public use of the expression was on the front page of the Sydney newspaper [[The Daily Telegraph (Sydney)|The Daily Telegraph]] on 17 April 2014 when Barry O'Farrell the Premier of New South Wales, was forced to resign, allegedly for accepting a gift of an expensive bottle of wine without declaring it, and then later denying in court that he had even received the gift. The headline, consisting of almost half the front page, read "A Barry Crocker".

In February 2022, news of the cancellation of Neighbours'' in the British press prompted fans of the TV show to download the theme song. It reached No. 1 on UK iTunes and at No. 11 on the UK Singles Sales Chart sales and downloads chart ending 17 February 2022.

References

External links
 Official website
 

1935 births
Australian autobiographers
Australian male film actors
Australian male singers
Australian male stage actors
Australian television personalities
Gold Logie winners
Living people
Members of the Order of Australia
Male actors from Geelong
Royal Australian Air Force personnel
Transatlantic Records artists